Neoepaphra pulchella is a species of beetle in the family Cerambycidae, and the only species in the genus Neoepaphra. It was described by Fisher in 1935.

References

Desmiphorini
Beetles described in 1935
Monotypic beetle genera